Terthreutis chiangmaiana is a species of moth of the family Tortricidae. It is found in Thailand, where it has been recorded from altitudes between 1,070 and 1,500 meters.

The wingspan is about 20 mm. The ground colour of the forewings is brownish cream, the costa tinged with ochreous and the apical area mixed with pale ferruginous. There is brownish strigulation (fine streaks), which become blackish brown along the dorsum. The hindwings are whitish cream. Adults have been recorded on wing from late April to early May and in February.

Etymology
The species name refers to the type locality, Chiang Mai, Thailand.

References

Moths described in 2008
Archipini
Moths of Asia